Suranga Perera (born 28 December 1974) is a Sri Lankan cricketer. He played forty first-class and six List A matches between 1994 and 2000. He his now an umpire and stood in matches in the 2016–17 Premier League Tournament.

References

External links
 

1974 births
Living people
Sri Lankan cricketers
Sri Lankan cricket umpires
Antonians Sports Club cricketers
Bloomfield Cricket and Athletic Club cricketers
Burgher Recreation Club cricketers
Cricketers from Colombo